Vaughan Watson (5 November 1931 – 10 December 1984) was an English professional footballer who played in the Football League for Chesterfield and Mansfield Town.

References

1931 births
1984 deaths
English footballers
Association football forwards
English Football League players
Mansfield Town F.C. players
Chesterfield F.C. players
Ransome & Marles F.C. players